Dutch Water Dreams (DWD) was an Olympic artificial whitewater and surfing centre in the Van Tuyllpark in Zoetermeer, Netherlands. It went bankrupt on 5 October 2015.

Water was pumped electrically down a series of drops, fashioned in concrete and between plastic bollards. The centre also contained a FlowRider sheet wave surfing system.

History 
The whitewater facility was opened on October 20th 2006.

During a periodically check in January 2015, DWD found corrosion on the metal parts in the FlowRider area. This corrosion adopted aggressive forms compared to the last measurement. Based on these findings it was decided to close the FlowRiders area immediately. An architectural research firm was hired to check the construction extensively, as the personal safety of the visitors and the structural safety of the building couldn't be guaranteed. Eventually, it led to the demise of the attraction. An adjacent swimming pool uses its parking lot.

References

External links
 Official website
 Video tour

Sports venues in South Holland
Artificial whitewater courses
Surfing locations
Sport in Zoetermeer